Since the founding of the Communist Party of Finland in 1918, the party has seen multiple splits and breakaway factions. Some of the breakaway organisations have thrived as independent parties, some have become defunct, while others have merged with the parent party or other political parties.

References

Political schisms
Lists of political parties in Europe
Finland, Communist Party breakaway
 
Finland politics-related lists